Port of Kuala Tanjung is a sea port at Batubara Regency, North Sumatra, Indonesia. Once fully functional the port can accommodate 60 million TEUs (twenty-foot equivalent units) per year as the biggest port in West Indonesia, bigger than Port of Tanjung Priok in Jakarta. The first phase of development of Kuala Tanjung Multipurpose Terminal was inaugurated in 2018. The first ship to dock at the port was the cruise ship SuperStar Libra on 5 April 2018 from Port Klang, Malaysia. The port made its debut in the global container market, with its first shipment on 28 March, 2020.

Development
Ground breaking of the port has been done on January 27, 2015. State-owned port operator Pelindo I has teamed up with the Netherlands-based Port of Rotterdam and Dubai-based port operator DP World in building the integrated port, which will in total cost about Rp 34 trillion (US$2.5 billion). Located in the strategic location near the busy waters of the Malacca Strait, Kuala Tanjung will be Indonesia's largest transit hub once finished. Sei Mangkei Special Economic Zone is being built along with Port of Kuala Tanjung as part of the strategy to turn North Sumatra as an international hub.

The port is part of the Maritime Silk Road that runs from the Chinese coast via the Suez Canal to the Mediterranean, there to the Upper Adriatic region of Trieste with its rail connections to Central and Eastern Europe.

Pelindo I has signed partnership agreement in the development of Kuala Tanjung Port with two port operators, the Port of Rotterdam Authority of the Netherlands and the Zhejiang Provincial Seaport Investment & Operation Group Co of China to transform Kuala Tanjung into a world-class maritime hub featuring peerless integration with nearby industrial parks, thereby strengthening its position in the Malacca Strait. 

Port of Kuala Tanjung will be developed in four phases. 
First phase is the construction of a multipurpose terminal from 2015 to 2017. 
Second phase is the development of  3000 hectares of an industrial zone from 2016 to 2018. 
Third phase is the development of a container port and residential area  from 2017 to 2019. 
The fourth phase is the construction of an integrated industrial zone or a port city from 2012 to 2023. 
The first phase of the project is estimated to cost Rp  2.5 trillion (US$188 million). The port is expected to start partial operations by the end of 2017. Soft launching will be done in June 2018, and the port will be inaugurated in August 2018.

See also

 List of Indonesian ports
 Ministry of Transportation, Indonesia
 Transport in Indonesia

References

K
Port authorities in Indonesia
K